Drupanol is a naturally occurring phenol and phytoandrogen that has been isolated from the seeds of Psoralea drupaceae. Although drupanol is sometimes said to be the same compound as bakuchiol, the two compounds are in fact distinct; they have the same molecular formula and weight but different chemical structures and hence are structural isomers.  Bakuchiol has been found to possess antiandrogenic activity in vitro.

References

Androgens and anabolic steroids
Phenols